Internal pudendal may refer to:
 Internal pudendal artery
 Internal pudendal veins